Crouching Tiger (虎蹲, hu-dun; or; 臥虎, wo-hu) may refer to:

Arts and entertainment
 Crouching Tiger, Hidden Dragon (臥虎藏龍), a 2000 U.S. Mandarin-language wuxia Hollywood film
 Crouching Tiger (picture book), a picture book by Ying Chang Compestine
 Wo Hu (臥虎), a 2006 Hong Kong crime drama film

Military
 Crouching Tiger Cannon (虎蹲砲, hudun pao), a  Ming dynasty bombard
 Crouching Tiger Trebuchet (虎蹲砲, hu-dun pao), a Song dynasty trebuchet
 Crouching Tiger Mountain (卧虎山, Wo Hu Shan), a bunker complex during the Taiyuan campaign
 Crouching Tiger Village (卧虎屯, Wo Hu Tun), a stronghold during the Battle of Siping

See also 

 Wohu (disambiguation) including 臥虎 (crouching tiger)
 Hudun (disambiguation) including 虎蹲 (crouching tiger)
 Crouching Tiger, Hidden Dragon (disambiguation)

 Tiger (disambiguation)